Sharona is a moshav in Israel.

Sharona may also refer to:

 Sharona Bakker (born 1990), Dutch hurdler
 Sharona Ben-Tov Muir, American writer and academic
 Sharona Fleming, a major character in the television series Monk
 Sharona, a recurring character on the American animated sitcom BoJack Horseman

See also 
 "My Sharona", a 1979 song by the rock band The Knack
 Sarona (disambiguation)

Feminine given names